Vladimir Petrovich Vajnshtok (2 March 1908 – 18 October 1978) was a Soviet film director and, under the name Vladimir Vladimirov, screenwriter.

Selected filmography

Director

 Rubicon (Рубикон) (1931)
 Storm (Ураган) (1932)
 The Children of Captain Grant (Дети капитана Гранта) (1936)
 Treasure Island (Остров сокровищ) (1938)
 The Headless Horseman (Всадник без головы) (1973)
 Armed and Dangerous (Вооружен и очень опасен) (1977)

Screenwriter
 Rubicon (Рубикон) (1931)
 Treasure Island (Остров сокровищ) (1938)
 Dead Season (1968)
 The Headless Horseman (Всадник без головы) (1973)
 Armed and Dangerous (Вооружен и очень опасен) (1977)
 Twenty Six Days from the Life of Dostoyevsky (Двадцать шесть дней из жизни Достоевского) (1980)

References

External links

Soviet film directors
1908 births
1987 deaths
Soviet screenwriters
Burials at Kuntsevo Cemetery
20th-century screenwriters